Team Apache is an attack helicopter flight simulator developed by Simis and published by Mindscape Group. Team Aapche's emphasis is commanding a group of six AH-64 Apache crews of the US Army in battles against the Communist FARC insurgents in Colombia and the Russian military in Latvia.

Team Apache was initially developed by Simis under Eidos Interactive. When Simis lead developers, Jonathan Newth and Ian Baverstock bought the company back from Eidos, they became an independent development team once more. Mindscape later purchased the publishing rights of the game.

Gameplay 

Team Apache focuses more on the gameplay aspects of command, tactics and battlefield realism, rather than the realism of flight and weapons systems modelling. The player manages the unit's morale, supply and maintenance, and the tactical planning that takes place before the mission. The geopolitical causes of Team Apaches wars are relayed in both the game's manual and the "daily" newspaper, with a focus on being realistic. Detailed military-style SITREPs create a picture of the tactical situation, and ground forces can be seen in the game fighting each other throughout the theatre using fairly realistic deployments and movements.

Team Apache contains various modes of play, including a multiplayer mode and a mission building application.

Plot 

In Team Apache, the player commands six AH-64 Apache crews of the US Army in battles against the Communist FARC insurgents in Colombia and the Russian military in Latvia. The storyline is developed through FMV sequences, in-mission briefings and newspaper articles.

Colombian Campaign 

In 1998, the Fuerzas Armadas Revolucionarias de Colombia–Ejército del Pueblo or FARC-EP (Spanish for "Revolutionary Armed Forces of Colombia–People's Army") has staged a large-scale guerrilla offensive against the government of Colombia. In its wake comes a wave of kidnappings and assassinations of high-ranking officials and their families. The corrupt and inefficient military of Colombia and police cannot hold their own against the insurgents, and need help from the United States. The United States needs to safeguard Colombia's oil industry and eliminate FARC's illegal cocaine industry.

Latvian Campaign

See also 

 Comanche  series of war simulation games

References

External links 
 Combatsim.com Team Apache interview A site dedicated to combat simulations, with an interview with Bryan Walker, the original concept developer for Team Apache.
 Gamespot review

Migman's Team Apache info

1998 video games
Helicopter video games
Simis games
Multiplayer and single-player video games
Mindscape games
Video games developed in the United Kingdom
Video games set in 1998
Video games set in Colombia
Windows games
Windows-only games